Kamila Karpiel (born 25 November 2001) is a Polish female ski jumper. She is a member of the national team, two-time Polish Champion (2017, 2018) and competed at the 2019 World Championships.

Her best place in the World Cup competition is 26th in Ljubno ob Savinji during the 2018–2019 season.

On 2 March 2019 she took part in the mixed team, alongside Kamil Stoch, Dawid Kubacki and Kinga Rajda, at the 2019 World Championships, it was Poland's debut in the mixed team at World Championships. Polish mixed team was surprisingly in third after the first round and took 6th place at the end.

World Championships

References

External links
 

2001 births
Living people
Polish female ski jumpers